The 2011–12 2. Bundesliga was the 38th season of the 2. Bundesliga, Germany's second tier of its football league system. The season commenced on 15 July 2011, three weeks earlier than the 2011–12 Bundesliga season, and ended with the last games on 6 May 2012. The traditional winter break was to be held between the weekends around 18 December 2011 and 4 February 2012. The league comprises eighteen teams.

Teams
At the end of the 2010–11 season, champions Hertha BSC and runners-up FC Augsburg were directly promoted to the 2011–12 Bundesliga. The Berlin side has directly returned to the highest German football league, while Augsburg ended a five-year tenure in the second level of German football. The two teams were replaced by Eintracht Frankfurt and FC St. Pauli, who were directly relegated from the 2010–11 Bundesliga season. Frankfurt returned to the 2. Bundesliga after six years, while St. Pauli made a direct comeback to the league.

On the other end of the table, Rot-Weiß Oberhausen and Arminia Bielefeld were directly relegated to the 2011–12 3. Liga, after finishing the 2010–11 season in the bottom two spots of the table. Oberhausen was dropped to the third level after three years, while Bielefeld will leave the 2. Bundesliga after two seasons. The two relegated teams were replaced by 2010–11 3. Liga champions Eintracht Braunschweig and runners-up Hansa Rostock. Braunschweig returned to the 2. Bundesliga after a total of four seasons at the third tier of the German football pyramid, while Rostock immediately bounced back from their relegation twelve months earlier.

A further two places were given to VfL Bochum as losers of the Bundesliga relegation playoff and Dynamo Dresden as winners of the 2. Bundesliga relegation playoff. Dresden returned to the 2. Bundesliga after a five-year absence after beating VfL Osnabrück 4–2 on aggregate; Osnabrück were thus immediately relegated back to the 3. Liga. In the Bundesliga playoff, Bochum retained its spot in the league after losing 2–1 on aggregate against Borussia Mönchengladbach.

Stadiums and locations

Personnel and sponsorships

Managerial changes

League table

Results

Relegation play-offs

The 16th-placed team faced the third-placed 2011–12 3. Liga side for a two-legged play-off. The winner on aggregate score after both matches will earn a spot in the 2012–13 2. Bundesliga.

Dates and times of these matches were determined by the Deutsche Fußball-Liga as following:

Tie ended 3–3 on aggregate; Jahn Regensburg promoted to 2012–13 2. Bundesliga, Karlsruhe relegated to 2012–13 3. Liga according to away goal rule.

Statistics

Top goalscorers
Source: Bundesliga.de

17 goals
  Alexander Meier (Eintracht Frankfurt)
  Olivier Occean (SpVgg Greuther Fürth)
  Nick Proschwitz (SC Paderborn 07)

14 goals
  Mohammadou Idrissou (Eintracht Frankfurt)
  Kevin Volland (1860 Munich)

13 goals
  Zlatko Dedič (Dynamo Dresden)
  Max Kruse (FC St. Pauli)
  Christopher Nöthe (SpVgg Greuther Fürth)
  Sascha Rösler (Fortuna Düsseldorf)

12 goals
  Mickaël Poté (Dynamo Dresden)
  Dimitar Rangelov (Energie Cottbus)

Top assists
Source: Bundesliga.de

12 assists
  Sercan Sararer (SpVgg Greuther Fürth)

10 assists
  Benjamin Lauth (1860 Munich)
  Sebastian Rode (Eintracht Frankfurt)

9 assists
  Stefan Leitl (FC Ingolstadt 04)

8 assists
  Benjamin Köhler (Eintracht Frankfurt)
  Torsten Mattuschka (1. FC Union Berlin)
  Alban Meha (SC Paderborn 07)
  Sascha Rösler (Fortuna Düsseldorf)

7 assists
  Marius Ebbers (FC St. Pauli)
  Jan Hochscheidt (Erzgebirge Aue)
  Alexander Iashvili (Karlsruher SC)
  Stephan Schröck (SpVgg Greuther Fürth)

References

External links
 Official site 
 Bundesliga on DFB page 
 kicker magazine 

2011-12
2
Ger